The United States ambassador to Kiribati is the official representative of the government of the United States to the government of Kiribati. The ambassador is concurrently the ambassador to Fiji, Nauru, Tonga, and Tuvalu, while residing in Suva, Fiji.

Ambassadors

See also
Kiribati – United States relations
Foreign relations of Kiribati
Ambassadors of the United States

References

United States Department of State: Background notes on Kiribati

External links
United States Department of State: Chiefs of Mission for Kiribati
United States Department of State: Kiribati
United States Embassy in Suva

Ambassadors of the United States to Kiribati
Kiribati
United States